Nikita Wu (born Wu Chi-ling 巫祈麟, 1975 in Taipei, Taiwan) is a Taiwanese writer and arts manager. She was the curator of the Future Pavilion in the Taiwan Design Expo 2005 and a project manager in the Taiwan Pavilion of the Venice Biennale 2006, for WEAK! architects in the 2009 Shenzhen & Hong Kong Bi-City Biennale of Urbanism/Architecture and in co-operation with the JUT Foundation for Arts & Architecture for the independent research centre Ruin Academy in Taipei.

Wu is the editor of the independent newspaper Cicada and the Anarchist Gardener.

References

External links 

 Soma Suihkulähde Nikita Wu's website
 Architecture of the WEAK! Robin Peckham, Kunsthalle Kowloon, 2009
 Cicada Nikita Wu, SZHK Biennale, 2009
 Bug Dome Archi-Europe, 2009

1975 births
Artists from Taipei
Living people
Taiwanese journalists
Taiwanese women writers